Olszanica  (Vil’shanytsia) is a village in Lesko County, Subcarpathian Voivodeship, in south-eastern Poland. It is the seat of the gmina (administrative district) called Gmina Olszanica.

The village has a population of 1,100.

Gallery

References

Villages in Lesko County